Philippe de Montebello (born May 16, 1936 in Paris) is a museum director.  He served from 1977 to 2008 as the director of the Metropolitan Museum of Art in New York.  On his retirement, he was both the longest-serving director in the institution's history and the third longest-serving director of any major art museum in the world (first is Irina Antonova, who was the Director of the Pushkin Museum of Fine Arts in Moscow for 52 years, from 1961 to 2013, making her the oldest and the longest serving director of a major art museum in the world; second is Knud W. Jensen, who served as the director of Denmark's Louisiana Museum of Modern Art north of Copenhagen for 35 years, from 1958 to 1993).  From January 2009, Montebello took up a post as the first Fiske Kimball Professor in the History and Culture of Museums at New York University's Institute of Fine Arts.

Born to a French aristocratic family, de Montebello immigrated to the United States of America in the 1950s, and became a naturalized citizen of the US in 1955.  He was educated in New York City at the Lycée Français de New York, graduated from Harvard University with a degree in art history, and earned an MA from New York University, after which he embarked on a career in Fine Arts.  He became the Director of the Metropolitan Museum in 1977 and has become widely known as the public face of the museum.

He announced his retirement on 8 January 2008, stating that he intended to step down by the end of 2008 after more than 31 years at his post.

Biography

Early life
Born Guy Philippe Henri Lannes de Montebello in Paris in 1936 to a family descended from the Napoleonic aristocracy, de Montebello was the second of four sons. His father, Marquis André Roger Lannes de Montebello (Biarritz, July 6, 1908 - New York City, December 2, 1986), was a portrait painter, art critic, and a member of the French Resistance during World War II. His mother, Germaine Wiener de Croisset (born in Paris, October 26, 1913 and married in Paris, November 30, 1933), was a descendant of the Marquis de Sade, a daughter of the playwright Francis de Croisset, and a half-sister of the arts patron Marie-Laure de Noailles. One of de Montebello's great-great-great-grandfathers was Jean Lannes, Duke of Montebello and Marshal of France.

Both parents were involved in a project to develop a form of three-dimensional photography, and it was in search of venture capital for this enterprise that the family came to New York in 1951. Whereas his brothers would all eventually return to France to take up jobs in banking, Philippe stayed in the United States and became an American citizen in 1955.

De Montebello was educated at the Lycée Français in New York, where he received his baccalauréat in 1954. He then went on to study art history at Harvard University, graduating magna cum laude in 1958. During his freshman year, De Montebello lived in Stoughton Hall. He continued his studies at the New York University Institute of Fine Arts, where he studied under Charles Sterling, an expert in French Renaissance art.

Early career
In 1963, he began work for the Met as a curatorial assistant in the Department of European Paintings, rising to full curator.  He then spent four-and-a-half-years (1969–1974) as Director of the Museum of Fine Arts in Houston, Texas, returning to the Met as vice director for curatorial and educational affairs.  He became director in 1977.

Family
On June 24, 1961 in New York, he married Edith Myles (born in New York, October 20, 1939), who is the financial-aid director of the Trinity School in New York City. They have three children:

 Marc André Marie de Montebello (born in New York, October 11, 1964), a New York University graduate and art dealer, married civilly at Choiseul and religiously at Marnes-la-Coquette, November 28, 1986 and divorced Laure Marie Dauphine de Sabran-Pontèves (born at Neuilly, February 26, 1966), by whom he had a son Alexandre (born in New York, May 9, 1987).
 Laure de Montebello (born in New York City, May 5, 1968), a Columbia University graduate and freelance writer, was married to Robert Bernstein, M.D., with two children, Claire and Maximilian (Max). She died in 2018 from complications of pancreatic cancer.
 Charles de Montebello (born in Houston, Texas, January 16, 1971), a New York University graduate and Grammy-winning sound engineer, is married to Raasa Leela Shields (born in Richmond, Virginia), and they have two children, Kivlighan Finch and Everest Leo Myles.

Curator of the Metropolitan Museum
Under Philippe de Montebello's directorship the Metropolitan Museum has nearly doubled in size to two million square feet. Notable changes have included the opening of the Carroll and Milton Petrie European Sculpture Court in 1990, new galleries for Greek & Roman art, the recently opened  Ruth and Harold D. Uris Center for Education, the remodeled and reinstalled galleries for Oceanic and Native North American art, and expanded galleries for Chinese, Cypriot, Ancient Near Eastern, and Korean art. In 2007, the Metropolitan reopened its expanded galleries for 19th- and early 20th-century European paintings and decorative arts, formerly Modernist, in a historicizing Beaux-Arts style, and a new high-ceilinged gallery to show off Giovanni Battista Tiepolo's monumental paintings to their best advantage. Criticism of de Montebello has focused on his alleged conservatism regarding modern and contemporary art: in a 1999 op-ed piece in The New York Times he lauded the city's mayor Rudy Giuliani for rubbishing Chris Ofili's infamous painting The Holy Virgin Mary, which used elephant dung as one of its materials. In the early years of his tenure, the Department of Modern Art was said to lag behind the museum's other departments in its spending power.  But in recent years, the Museum has purchased iconic works by Jasper Johns, Damien Hirst, and Robert Rauschenberg, and mounted exhibitions by contemporary artists like Johns, Rauschenberg, Tara Donovan, Sean Scully, and Kara Walker.

Mr. de Montebello's other major building programs have included the expansion and renovation of period rooms and galleries for the decorative arts, the opening of new permanent exhibition galleries for drawings, prints, and photographs (supplemented in 2007 with the new Joyce and Robert Menschel Hall for Modern Photography), the conservation and installation of the Gubbio Studiolo, the opening of the Antonio Ratti Textile Conservation Center, the opening of the new Mary and Michael Jaharis Gallery for Byzantine art, and the installation of Coptic art in a crypt-like gallery carved out of former storage space beneath the museum's Great Hall staircase.

Under de Montebello's directorship, the Met acquired many major private collections, notably the Jack and Belle Linsky Collection of European Paintings, sculpture, and decorative arts; the Heinz Berggruen collection of works by Paul Klee; the gift of 10 paintings by Clyfford Still by the artist's widow; the Annenberg Collection of Impressionist and Post-Impressionist paintings; the Florene Schoenborn collection of 20th-century works; the Jacques and Natasha Gelman Collection of modern paintings; the Gilman Paper Company Collection of 19th-century photographs; the Muriel Kallis Steinberg Newman Collection of Abstract Expressionist and other modern works; and most recently, the Diane Arbus archive.

De Montebello also worked to acquire a number of individual masterpieces over the years, including works by Vermeer, Rubens, Guercino, and Nikolaus Gerhaert von Leyden.  Among the most celebrated of these acquisitions have been the 11th-century gilt-bronze Cambodian deified king known as the "Golden Boy" in 1988; Vincent van Gogh's Wheat Field with Cypresses in 1993, Jasper Johns'  White Flag in 1998, and in 2004 the Madonna and Child by the Renaissance master Duccio di Buoninsegna.

Throughout this period, the Met under de Montebello's leadership mounted some 30 special exhibitions annually, involving not only all the museum's 17 curatorial departments, but also presenting works of art on loan from public and private collections around the world (current shows listed on the museum's website, metmuseum.org).  Many of the shows were accompanied by the publication of major catalogues.  Under de Montebello, the Met has become the leading art book publisher in the U.S., issuing some 25-30 illustrated volumes each year, most carrying an introduction by the director.

Long the "voice of the Met," de Montebello also narrates the Met's audio guides for both exhibitions and the permanent collection. He lectures on museological matters throughout the world, and has also given public readings of French poetry by Baudelaire, Rimbaud and others at the museum.

Retirement
On January 8, 2008, he announced his intention to retire by the end of 2008. He was succeeded by Thomas Campbell in September 2008.

Association of Art Museum Curators
De Montebello assisted in the formation of the Association of Art Museum Curators in 2001, and later helped forge its policy on spoliated World War II-era art, advocating transparent research into the ownership history of museum collections, and testifying on Capitol Hill.  In August 2006 he successfully negotiated the precedent-setting agreement with the Italian government that ended years of disputes regarding the legal ownership of several works in its Greek and Roman collections.  Under the terms of the historic pact, Italy provided long-term loans to the Met in exchange for the return of these works.

Teaching
De Montebello is the first professor to teach the history and culture of museums at New York University's Institute of Fine Arts.  In addition to being a full-time professor at the IFA, where he discusses topics such as the history of collecting and the progression and modernization of museums, de Montebello also advises NYU on its planned overseas campus and curriculum in Abu Dhabi, scheduled to begin enrolling students in 2010.  He began teaching at NYU in January 2009 as well as consulting and lecturing at several museums on the modernization of their collections. In 2012, de Montebello served as the Humanitas Visiting Professor in the History of Art at the University of Cambridge.

De Montebello also serves as co-host of NYC-ARTS, a weekly program highlighting current New York City exhibitions, cultural institutions and profiling relevant contributors to the arts on Thirteen/WNET.

In April, 2015 the Hispanic Society of America announced the appointment of Philippe de Montebello to chair the Society's Board of Overseers and spearhead a major effort to roughly double the museum's size by renovating the now-vacant, adjacent, Beaux Arts, former building of the Museum of the American Indian.

Honors
Montebello was named a Gold Medal Honoree of the National Institute of Social Sciences in 1989. Montebello was made a Chevalier de la Légion d'Honneur in 1991 (he was promoted to the rank of Officier in 2007). His adopted home country followed suit by awarding him the National Medal of Arts in 2002, the National Humanities Medal in 2010, and the Mayor's Arts Award in 2007. De Montebello was elected to the American Philosophical Society in 2001 and the American Academy of Arts and Sciences in 2004. De Montebello was also awarded the Order of Isabel la Catolica, Encomienda de Numero; the Spanish Institute Gold Medal Award; Knight Commander, Pontifical Order of St. Gregory the Great; the 2002 Blerancourt Prize; the 2004 Amigos del Museo del Prado Prize; and in 2007 the Order of the Rising Sun, Gold & Silver Star, from the Government of Japan. In 2017, Montebello received the Edmund Burke Award for Culture and Society, awarded by monthly cultural review The New Criterion. He has received honorary degrees from New York University, Dartmouth College, Lafayette College, Bard College, Iona College, the Savannah College of Art and Design, and his alma mater, Harvard. De Montebello is a recipient of The International Center in New York's Award of Excellence.

References

Sources 
 Houghton, James R. et al., Philippe de Montebello and The Metropolitan Museum of Art, 1977–2008, 184 pp,  New Haven: Yale University Press, 2009,

Further reading
  Rendez-vous with Art by Philippe de Montebello and Martin Gayford. 2014, Thames and Hudson.

External links 
 The Philippe de Montebello Years: Curators Celebrate Three Decades of Acquisitions Exhibition at the Metropolitan Museum of Art
 Biography, Dartmouth News
 Interview with de Montebello, Apollo magazine
Transcript of Philippe de Montebello's Director's Selections audio tour at the Metropolitan Museum of Art

1936 births
Living people
American art curators
Harvard University alumni
New York University Institute of Fine Arts alumni
Directors of the Metropolitan Museum of Art
French emigrants to the United States
Directors of museums in the United States
Chevaliers of the Légion d'honneur
Recipients of the Order of the Rising Sun
National Humanities Medal recipients
New York University faculty
Lycée Français de New York alumni
Members of the American Philosophical Society